Behabad-e Saleh (also Romanized as Behābād-e Şāleḩ; also known as Behābād and Bīābād-e Şāleḩ) is a village in Howmeh Rural District, in the Central District of Gilan-e Gharb County, Kermanshah Province, Iran. At the 2006 census, its population was 207, in 47 families.

References 

Populated places in Gilan-e Gharb County